Theatre by the Lake is situated on the shores of Derwentwater in the Lake District in Keswick, Cumbria, England. It opened in 1999, replacing the mobile Century Theatre, and was made possible by an Arts Council Lottery Fund Grant. From May to November a resident company of up to 14 actors perform a Summer Season of six plays in repertory. The theatre also produces a Christmas show and two Spring shows (one in the Main House and one in the Studio). The theatre hosts festivals including the Words by the Water literature festival, the Jennings Keswick Jazz Festival, Keswick Film Festival and events in the Keswick Mountain Festival.  In addition, the theatre offers a wide range of visiting drama, music, dance, talks, comedy and film.

History 
The mobile touring Century Theatre first visited Keswick in 1961 and settled full-time in the Lakeside car park on the shores of Derwentwater in 1975. Outline planning permission was granted for a permanent building on the site in 1991, and in 1996 the Century Theatre was moved to Snibston Discovery Museum to make way for it. Work on the building began in 1998; the ground was broken by the theatre's patron, Dame Judi Dench. A significant proportion of the £6.5m building cost was contributed by the National Lottery. The name Theatre by the Lake was decided by public consultation and the first performance in the new building was on 19 August 1999.

The theatre has two auditoria: 400 seats in the Main House; and 100 seats in the Studio.

Productions

References

External links 

Theatre by the Lake
NW Theatre's page on Theatre by the Lake and its past productions, including touring productions.

Theatres in Cumbria
1999 establishments in England
Tourist attractions in Cumbria
Keswick, Cumbria